Paul Chester Latawski (1954-present)  is a British historian and writer associated with the Royal Military Academy Sandhurst, whose areas of expertise include military history and history of Poland.

He has been and author of several books and articles, and an editor of works such as The Reconstruction of Poland, 1914-23 (1992), Contemporary  Nationalism in East Central Europe (1995) or Exile Armies (2005), together with Matthew Bennett, ​ among others.

Works 
 Great Britain and the rebirth of Poland 1914-1918 (1986)
 The Security route to Europe: the Visegrad Four (1994)
 The Transformation of the Polish Armed Forces: Preparing for NATO (1999)
 The Kosovo Crisis and the Evolution of Post-Cold War European Security (2003), together with Martin A. Smith
 Falaise Pocket: defeating the German Army in Normandy (2004)
 The Inherent Tensions in Military Doctrine (2011)

References 

1954 births
Historians of Poland
People associated with the Royal Military Academy Sandhurst
British military historians
Living people